In atomic physics, the Landé interval rule  states that, due to weak angular momentum coupling (either spin-orbit or spin-spin coupling), the energy splitting between successive sub-levels are proportional to the total angular momentum quantum number (J or F) of the sub-level with the larger of their total angular momentum value (J or F).

Background 

The rule assumes the Russell–Saunders coupling and that interactions between spin magnetic moments can be ignored. The latter is an incorrect assumption for light atoms. As a result of this, the rule is optimally followed by atoms with medium atomic numbers.

The rule was first stated in 1923 by German-American physicist Alfred Landé.

Derivation  

As an example, consider an atom with two valence electrons and their fine structures in the LS-coupling scheme. We will derive heuristically the interval rule for the LS-coupling scheme and will remark on the similarity that leads to the interval rule for the hyperfine structure. 

The interactions between electrons couple their orbital and spin angular momentums. Then the coupling in the LS-scheme gives rise to a Hamiltonian: 

where    and    encode the strength of the coupling. The Hamiltonian    acts as a perturbation to the state   . The coupling would cause the total orbital    and spin    angular momentums to change directions, but the total angular momentum    would remain constant. Its z-component    would also remain constant, since there is no external torque acting on the system. The exact linear combination, however, is unnecessary to determine the energy shift. 

To study this perturbation, we consider the vector model where we treat each    as a vector.    and    precesses around the total orbital angular momentum   . Consequently, the component perpendicular to    averages to zero over time, and thus only the component along  needs to be considered. That is,   .

Applying this change to all the terms in the Hamiltonian, we can rewrite it as 
 

 
The energy shift is then 
 

 
Now we can apply the substitution  to write the energy as
 

 
Consequently, the energy interval between adjacent   sub-levels is: 
 

 
This is the Landé interval rule. 

As an example, consider a    term, which has 3 sub-levels   .

As for the spin-spin interaction responsible for the hyperfine structure, because the Hamiltonian of the hyperfine interaction can be written as 
 

 
 

  
where    is the total angular momentum   . The derivation is essentially the same, but with nuclear spin   , angular momentum    and total angular momentum   .

Limitations 
The interval rule holds when the coupling is weak. In the LS-coupling scheme, a weak coupling means the energy of spin-orbit coupling  is smaller than residual electrostatic interaction: . Here the residual electrostatic interaction refers to the term including electron-electron interaction after we employ the central field approximation to the Hamiltonian of the atom. For the hyperfine structure, the interval rule for two magnetic moments can be disrupted by magnetic quadruple interaction between them, so we want . 

For example, in helium, the spin-spin interactions and spin-other-orbit interaction have an energy comparable to that of the spin-orbit interaction.

References 

Atomic physics